Ezra Hounsfield Riley (June 5, 1866 – January 5, 1937) was a Canadian politician and rancher in Alberta, Canada. Riley served in the Legislative Assembly of Alberta from 1906–1910.

Early life
Riley was born in 1866 in Yorkville, Canada West (a suburb of Toronto then). He owned a large sum of land that he sold off to the City of Calgary in 1904. The land was developed into the historical Hillhurst-Sunnyside community northwest of Downtown.

1906 by-election
Riley was elected to the Legislative Assembly of Alberta in a by-election for the Alberta Liberal Party on December 7, 1906. He would be re-elected to a second term in the 1909 Alberta general election.

Resignation and defeat
After serving a year into his second term he resigned his seat to protest the leadership of Arthur Sifton who became leader of the Liberal party in the wake of the Alberta and Great Waterways Railway scandal. Riley would run in the subsequent by-election on October 3, 1910 The Conservatives did not run a candidate in that by-election instead choosing to support Riley.

Explaining his resignation in a memorable stump speech on September 30, 1910 Riley was quoted as saying 

On election day Riley was defeated  by 100 votes in a hotly and bitterly contested by-election rife with accusations of tampered voters lists.

His brother Harold Riley would end up winning the district for the Conservatives in another by-election almost exactly a year later.

Honors
Riley Park in Calgary, Alberta, the site of which was on his former ranch is named in his honor.

References

External links
Legislative Assembly of Alberta Members Listing
Ezra Riley Pioneer Profiles

1866 births
1937 deaths
Alberta Liberal Party MLAs